Höpfigheim is a town in Steinheim an der Murr, Ludwigsburg District, in the state of Baden-Württemberg, Germany.

Towns in Baden-Württemberg